Robert Herman Steiner (born 20 June 1973) is a Swedish former professional footballer who played as a striker. He represented IFK Norrköping, Bradford City, Queens Park Rangers, and Walsall during a career that spanned between 1992 and 2000. He won three caps and scored one goal for the Sweden national team in 1997.

Career
Steiner started out playing football in his homeland with IFK Norrköping. He moved to England in 1996, originally on loan to Bradford City when manager Chris Kamara signed Steiner, fellow Swede Magnus Pehrsson and Norwegian striker Ole Bjørn Sundgot. Steiner was the most successful of the three after scoring three league goals during his loan spell, and more famously one of the three goals in the 3–2 FA Cup triumph over Everton. Steiner's form earned him a call-up to the national side. He won three caps and scored one goal.

Kamara bought the Swede for £500,000 the following summer. In his first and only full season at Valley Parade he forged a deadly partnership with Brazilian Edinho. The pair each scored ten goals and were the club's leading goalscorers during 1997–98. The following summer new manager Paul Jewell was given cash to spend by chairman Geoffrey Richmond and Steiner fell out of favour. He played just one League Cup game in 1998–99 in a 1–1 draw with Lincoln City.

Steiner was loaned out twice to Queens Park Rangers and once to Walsall before he was signed permanently by QPR for £215,000. But after just 24 games and six goals he was forced to retire due to injury at just 27 in November 2000.

Career statistics

International 

 Scores and results list Sweden's goal tally first, score column indicates score after each Steiner goal.

Honours 
Sweden

 King's Cup: 1997

References

External links

1973 births
Swedish footballers
Swedish expatriate footballers
Expatriate footballers in England
Swedish expatriate sportspeople in England
Sweden international footballers
IFK Norrköping players
Bradford City A.F.C. players
Queens Park Rangers F.C. players
Walsall F.C. players
Living people
Association football forwards